John Septimus Grover (30 October 1766 – 28 November 1852) was an English first-class cricketer with amateur status who played a single match for the Marylebone Cricket Club against a Hornchurch side at Lord's Old Ground in May 1790, scoring 3 and 18 not out. He took 3 wickets in one innings, all bowled.

References

1766 births
1852 deaths
English cricketers
English cricketers of 1787 to 1825
Marylebone Cricket Club cricketers